{{Infobox animanga/Header
| name            = Space Carrier Blue Noah
| image           = BlueNoah.jpg
| caption         = Space Carrier Blue Noah OP theme single
| ja_kanji        = 宇宙空母ブルーノア
| ja_romaji       = Uchū Kūbo Burū Noa
| genre           = Drama, Science fiction
}}

 is a science fiction anime television series produced by Office Academy which ran in Japan from October 13, 1979 through March 30, 1980. It was later distributed overseas in English by West Cape Corporation under the name "Thundersub". The series was called "Nave Anti-Espacial" (Anti-Space Ship) in many Spanish-speaking countries.

Set in the year 2052, Earth has managed to find peace until the arrival of the Death Force – ruthless aliens from a dying solar system – who are desperately searching for a new home. Attacking the Earth with a massive satellite ship called Terror Star, the aliens proceed to terraform the planet to make it their own. For mankind there is one hope: it's up to Colin Collins and a small band of his fellow surviving students to crew a top-secret submersible vessel that can fight the invaders at sea or in space.

Plot

In the year 2052, the planet Gotham, situated around 30 light years from Earth, was about to be destroyed when a roving black hole is about to engulf its sun and the entire planetary system. When all attempts to avert tragedy failed, the scientist named Leader Zytel (General Zee in the English dub) announced to all of Gotham that he was able to construct a space ship/satellite capable of housing 200 million people of Gotham (Gothamites) and save their species from extinction. This space ship/satellite was named Terror Star and is capable of traveling vast distances in order to search for a new home planet. Zytel asked for absolute power in order to be able to carry out this monumental task of saving their race. Hence, Zytel becomes the highest leader of the Gothamites survivors living in Terror Star.

After thirty years of wandering endlessly in space, Terror Star crossed path with the planet Earth. Leader Zytel quickly ordered the scouting of the planet to determine its suitability to be the next home of the Gothamites. They sent fake meteorites with transmitters in order to scout the planet. The high generals of Gotham immediately noted that a civilization exists on Earth and even though the planet is not exactly suitable to house the Gothamites, it can be made hospitable by extensive terra-forming.

Meanwhile, on Earth, scientists study the fake meteor fragments that landed on Earth and found out their real content. They were able to conclude that an intelligent alien species were conducting a study of the Earth and were anxious of the intentions of the aliens. The nine major scientific research centers around the world, named N1 to N9, were informed of the situation and the political, military, and scientific leaders of Earth were summoned to N1 – the headquarters of all the research centers to discuss the next steps. One of these scientist is named Dr. Cromwell Colins – head of the oceanographic research center affiliated with N1.

Because of their spying capabilities, Gotham was made aware of this event and General Gulf decided to launch a preemptive attack on Earth in order to take advantage of the situation where all world leaders are vulnerable in one place. Gotham's space ships destroyed the Earth's extraterrestrial research facilities and attacked Earth – destroying much of the civilization on Earth including research centers N2 to N8. Only research center N1 and N9 was able to escape destruction. Dr Colins was one of those killed by the attack. Before he died, he gave his son – Colin Collins – a pendant and asked him to remember the word "Thundersub". He then asked Colin to proceed to research center N1 since the hope of humanity is in there. Colin and his high school classmates then met a mysterious young lady named Anna who cannot talk because she was in a state of shock during a brief stopover on one of Colin's classmates home. Colin and team then boarded a flying craft and decided to proceed to N1 to fulfill his father's wishes.

Terror Star move to stay in orbit of the planet Earth. Because of the tidal forces brought about by the new satellite, the Earth's axis was shifted and geological and environmental disasters like tornadoes, earthquakes, and volcanic eruptions occurred. Ninety percent of the Earth's population were wiped out in less than a day. The few remaining survivors of the human race escaped to the mountains.

Within days, the Gothamite occupation has built a series of sea fortresses around the world that converts sea water to heavy water – the aliens main source of energy. Meanwhile, Colin and his other classmates arrived at research center N1. The team decided to go for a swim in the bay side of the island research center when suddenly they were pulled under by a whirlpool. They ended up in an underwater lake inside a cave at the bottom of research center N1. The pendant that Colin's father gave him suddenly started glowing and points to a door. Using the pendant, they were able to open the door and walked their way through darkness right into Blue Noah's (Thundersub) bridge. They recognized a command input panel where Colin spoke the word "Thundersub". Blue Noah was activated and broke free of the island research center N1.

Near where Blue Noah was drifting after being activated, Blue Noah's sister submarine – the Tempest Junior – was returning from a test being conducted by Ei Domon (Captain Noah in the English dub) and his crew when they spotted Blue Noah afloat. They discovered that a group of teenagers are aboard the submarine. After the Tempest docked at the bow of Blue Noah, the crew met the youngsters and the Captain learned that Colin's father was Dr. Cromwell Collins who designed the submarine. The Captain also saw Anna – who turned out to be his daughter whom he had bad relations with because she thinks that the captain abandoned her and her dying mother for the sake of duty.

Colin and his classmates and Anna were allowed to be part of Blue Noah's crew by serving in Tempest Junior. After a couple of skirmishes with the Death Force – the military arm of Gotham headed by Colonel Jrgens (Colonel Lupus in the English dub), Blue Noah saw the wreckage of a fighter plane containing an unnamed pilot. They rescued the pilot from the wreckage and brought him to Blue Noah for medical treatment. After destroying a Death Force sea fortress using the anti proton gun, the pilot who was rescued from the wreckage came about and talked to Captain Noah. He told the captain that he is Flight Lieutenant Domingo from research center N9 and he was ordered to go to N1 to meet Blue Noah and inform them that they should proceed to N9 in order to upgrade Blue Noah with an Aero Conversion Engine which would make the warship capable of outer space flight.

Captain Noah now embarks on a mission to reach research center N9 which is located in Bermuda. During the course of the trip, the Blue Noah encountered many skirmishes to save humans taken as slaves by the Death Force and also innocent people who were caught in the war. Because of the many successes of Blue Noah, Col. Jrgens held a personal vendetta with the warship and vows to destroy it one way or another. Among the people that were rescued by Blue Noah were Tara and Kapira – natives of a small island called Gypsy Atoll.

The trip to Bermuda was deferred when Blue Noah learned of the construction of Gravity Control base in both the North and South poles. The Gravity Control base is designed to alter the gravitational characteristics of Earth in order to make it hospitable to the Gothamites. Once fully operational, they would change the living conditions on the planet and make it uninhabitable by humans – thus causing their extinction. Captain Noah ordered to strike the two bases simultaneously – Blue Noah will strike the base at the south pole while Tempest Jr. will destroy the north pole base. Blue Noah was successfully able to destroy the south pole Gravity Control base. However, Tempest Jr. failed in its attempt to destroy the north pole base and was heavily damaged in doing so. Skipper Bergen sacrificed his life to save the Tempest from destruction when it was caught in an anti submarine net.

The captain learned of the failure to destroy the north pole base and have rendezvous with Tempest Jr. They then set sail to N9 in order to upgrade the warship before making plans to destroy the north pole base. En route to N9, they destroyed the biggest Death Force sea fortress in the Panama Canal by using the Anti Proton Gun. After some sojourn in the Amazon, they were finally able to reach research center N9 in Bermuda.

At research center N9, Blue Noah underwent extensive modifications in order to prepare it for space travel using the Aero Conversion Engine. Tempest Jr. was decommissioned and the crew were reassigned to various post among Blue Noah and its three new companion space ships. After 48 hours, the modifications to Blue Noah was complete and the crew prepared for an all out offensive against the Death Force. Now capable of flight, Blue Noah destroyed the Gravity Control base in the north pole while Lt. Domingo and his squadron destroyed the Death Force's center of operations on Earth in the Sahara desert – with Lt. Domingo sacrificing himself to complete the mission.

Blue Noah along with its three companion space ships then flew to outer space in order to confront Terror Star itself orbiting above the planet Earth. Hegeler and Jrgens were pleading with Leader Zytel (General Z) in order to send more reinforcements to Earth in order to destroy Blue Noah when they learned that it is headed for Terror Star. Battle after battle ensued with Blue Noah firing the Anti Proton Gun in order to destroy all the enemy warships and damage Terror Star itself. Hegeler told Zytel that they should just look for a new planet since they will not be able to conquer Earth. Zytel vehemently rejects the idea. During this time, Hegeler learned through his scout that most of the 200 million Gotham citizens of Terror Star are dead because of a flaw in the design of the satellite causing the life support systems to fail. He then concluded that the reason why Zytel decided to stay on Earth and make it their new home is because the satellite can no longer go further to look for a new planet more hospitable to Gothamites because of this flaw in the design. Zytel intended to make Earth the dream planet in order to cover up for the flaw in Terror Star's design even if Earth was not the ideal planet for their people.

Col. Jrgens went on a one on one duel with Blue Noah. Just when the duel is about to start, Hegeler discovered another treacherous plan of the leader Zytel. When Zytel discovered about the Terror Star's flawed design, he preserved the Gothamites in computer cells and had plans to escape the satellite with these cells to Earth. When Zytel was confronted by Hegeler, Zytel vehemently denied the accusations. Hegeler then ordered that they should now leave Earth. Zytel tried to stop him and in the struggle that ensued Zytel was stabbed by Hegeler to his death. Outside, Jrgens was defeated by Blue Noah and was killed when his ship was destroyed. On the other hand, Captain Noah was severely wounded by shrapnel on his chest and he expired a few moments later. Before the captain died, he asked Colin to take over command of the fleet and told him to do whatever is necessary in order to save the Earth.

Hegeler took leadership of the Gothamites and he maneuvered Terror Star to sail out of the solar system by using Jupiter's gravitational force to slingshot the satellite outside the system. However, the engines are no longer functioning normally and the satellite was sent on a direct collision course to planet Earth. Blue Noah plotted an intercept course to ram Terror Star and place it out of Earth's path. However, calculations show that it is too late for anything to be done by Blue Noah.

Just as when the Terror Star was about to impact Earth, Hegeler ordered that the engines be forced to start even with the risk of them exploding. In the nick of time, Terror Star was able to alter course to prevent collision with the Earth. The tidal forces brought about by this event forced the Earth's axis to be shifted back to its original position.

As Terror Star makes its way to the outer realms of the solar system, Hegeler contacted Blue Noah and talked to Colins never to repeat the same mistakes they did by choosing a selfish leader. Terror Star's navigation systems and engines overheated and exploded, which caused the satellite to drift directly into the sun and its destruction instead of it escaping the solar system. That was the end of the Gotham civilization. The Earth was saved from the Gotham threat for good.

In the aftermath, Captain Noah was given an honorable burial and his epitaph simply reads "The man who saved Earth". Colins and Anna got married and set up an organization that helped in the prevention of extraterrestrial invasion.

Voice cast
 Shin Kusaka: Tōru Furuya
 Kei Domon: Chiyoko Kawashima
 Ei Domon (Captain of the Blue Noah): Hidekatsu Shibata
 Chūji Shimizu (Chief Petty Officer, Captain of the Shīra) and Gulf (Godom's Governor-general on the Earth): Masatō Ibu
 Jürgens: Makio Inoue
 Leader Zytel and Domenico: Toshio Furukawa
 Hegeler (Godom's 2nd Governor-general on the Earth) and Seiji Matsukura: Masaharu Satō
 Sol-Gel and Jacopetti (Chief Cook): Kōji Yada
 Shō Hidaka: Ichiro Mizuki
 Hiroshi Izumi (Steerman of the Shīra): Akira Murayama
 Michirō Tamura and Taku Nakahira (Chief Officer of Intelligence and Communications): Shigeru Chiba
 Tatsuya Inoue: Hidemitsu Hori
 Katsuhiko Miyoshi and Kazuomi Hiraga (Chief Officer of Science and Technology): Kan Tokumaru
 Kenta Kōchiyama and Bunzō Shimanuki (Chief Engineer): Hiroshi Ōtake
 Dr. Sayoko Sakuramachi (Surgeon): Keiko Yamamoto
 President of the Earth Federation: Kunihiko Kitagawa
 Dr. Kenjirō Kusaka: Kōhei Miyauchi
 Iwase: Kōji Totani
 Kapira:
 Tara: Kazuko Matsuzawa
 Farrah Arnoul: Yumi Nakatani
 Narrator: Ryō Ishihara

Production staff
Planning and Original Design: Yoshinobu Nishizaki
Producer: Takashi Iijima
Director: Kazunori Tanahashi
Script: Hideaki Yamamoto, Seiji Matsuoka, Takashi Yamada
Storyboard General Director: Kenzō Koizumi
Storyboard Director: Yoshiyuki Hane
Production Director: Kazunori Tanahashi
Character Design: Yoshiyuki Hane
Mechanical Design: Yūji Kaida, Takayuki Masuo
Special Effects Supervisor: Ryūichi Kaneko
Music(compose): Masaaki Hirao, Hiroshi Miyagawa
Music(arrangement): Motoki Funayama
Theme Song: Space Carrier Blue Noah: Toward the Great OceanLyrics: Michio Yamagami
Compose: Masaaki Hirao
Arrangement: Motoki Funayama
Vocals: Mayo Kawasaki
Ending Theme: Night CruiseLyrics: Michio Yamagami
Compose: Masaaki Hirao
Arrangement: Motoki Funayama
Vocals: Mayo Kawasaki

Episode list
Following is a list of all 24 episode titles, with an English translation first, followed by the original Japanese (and a rōmaji transliteration in parentheses).

(2-hour special) Birth of the Young Lions若き獅子たちの誕生(Wakaki Shishi-tachi no Tanjō)
The Blue Noah Descends Southブルーノア南下す(Burū Noa Nanka su)
Coral Reef Rescue Missionサンゴ礁救出作戦(Sangoshō Kyūshutsu Sakusen)
The Secret of Gotham Baseゴドム基地の秘密(Godomu Kichi no Himitsu)
Gotham's Terraforming Planゴドムの地球改造計画(Godomu no Chikyū Kaizō Keikaku)
Adam and Eve of the South Seas南海のアダムとイブ(Nankai no Adamu to Ibu)
Burning Southern Cross燃える南十字星(Moeru Minami Jūjisei)
Attack That Tower!あの塔を撃て!(Ano Tō wo Ute!)
Hurricane of Love and Anger愛と怒りのハリケーン(Ai to Ikari no Harikēn)
Detour of Decision決断のまわり道(Ketsudan no Mawari-michi)
Vow to Tomorrowあしたへの誓い(Ashita e no Chikai)
Sarah, Her Loveファラ、その愛(Fara, Sono Ai)
Crimson Tide Hell of Fear恐怖の赤潮地獄(Kyōfu no Akashio Jigoku)
Thrilling! The Dummy Strategy痛快! ダミー作戦(Tsūkai! Damī Sakusen)
First Report from Bermudaバミューダからの第一報(Bamyūda kara no Dai Ippō)
Heroic! Rush into the Arctic Ocean壮烈! 北極海突入(Sōretsu! Hokkyoku-kai Totsunyū)
Showdown in the Abyss深海の一騎打ち(Shinkai no Ikkiuchi)
The American Channel Breakthrough Strategyアメリカ海峡突破作戦(Amerika Kaikyō Toppa Sakusen)
Amazon Surprise Strategyアマゾン奇襲作戦(Amazon Kishū Sakusen)
48 Hours in Bermudaバミューダ48時間(Bamyūda 48jikan)
Now, to Spaceいざ、宇宙へ(Iza, Uchū e)
Gotham's True Colorsゴドムの正体(Godomu no Shōtai)
Gotham, Where To Go?!ゴドムよ、何処へ?!(Godomu yo, Izuko e?!)
Earth, Forever!地球よ、永遠に!(Chikyū yo, Eien ni!)

The first episode was originally broadcast as a feature-length "TV special" to
introduce the series, later split into four 30-minute episodes for rebroadcast
by Japanese local TV stations:
1-1.Wanderer of the Cosmos大宇宙の放浪者(Dai-uchū no Hōrōsha)
1–2.The Hope of the Earth Is This!!地球の希望はこれだ!!(Chikyū no Kibō wa Kore da!!)
1–3.A Big Crisis! Blue Noah大危機!ブルーノア(Dai Kiki! Burū Noa)
1–4.Fire the Anti-proton Gun!反陽子砲 発射!(Han-yōshi-hō Hassha!)

TV
 The complete series was aired dubbed in English on CKVR-TV and CFPL-TV in Canada, RPN-9 and IBC-13 in the Philippines (1983–84), NTA in Nigeria, StarPlus in India and on the NBC Super Channel in Europe (early 1990s?).

Blue Noah specifications
Standard Displacement: 170,000 standard tons
Classification: Super Submarine Aircraft Carrier
Fighter Capacity: 150

Closing the starboard and port flight decks makes it possible for the Blue Noah to submerge for underwater cruising. It is equipped with a lightwave booster, making both atmospheric and extra-atmospheric operation possible. The Tempest Junior mini-submersible is housed in the bow of the ship, large Bison attack helicopter known as "Rocketcopter" is stowed in the stern and the lower decks serve as a hangar for numerous fighter jets. The Tempest Junior features an anti-gravity drive allowing the crew to detach from the main ship for "away missions."

Blue Noah's most powerful weapon is the Anti-Proton Gun. When initiated, the prow of the ship separates into upper and lower halves, revealing a massive energy generator. Electrical power from all of the ship's onboard systems is diverted to power this generator, creating a massive burst of energy powerful enough to annihilate a target completely. This enormous energy requirement renders Blue Noah's systems temporarily offline after a single burst of the Anti-Proton Gun, and as such the weapon is used only as a last resort during Earth sorties. Extensive modifications are made to the Blue Noah prior to the final assault on the alien invaders, enabling the ship to use the Anti-Proton Gun repeatedly in space without the resulting system downtime.

Other appearances
The early part of the 2009 anime film Space Battleship Yamato: Resurrection has an appearance by a ship called the Blue Noah. This Blue Noah is the flagship of Earth's immigration fleet. There is no indication, however, that the events of the Blue Noah anime are connected, in any way, to the same fictional universe in which the Yamato stories occur. This was most likely done as an homage.

See also
Space battleshipSpace Battleship Yamato: Resurrection''

External links
Thundersub HQ fansite

Review of the Thundersub Video
 Blue Noah (Anime Mundi), production credits and images.
Limited edition Sony Music Shop original soundtrack CD (order deadline was 2008.2.6).

1979 anime television series debuts
1980 manga
Drama anime and manga
Japanese science fiction television series
Science fiction anime and manga
Yomiuri Telecasting Corporation original programming